42 Aquilae, abbreviated 42 Aql, is a single star in the equatorial constellation of Aquila. 42 Aquilae is its Flamsteed designation.

The stellar classification of this star is F3 IV/V, which matches an F-type star with blended spectral traits of a main sequence star and a subgiant star. It is around 1.3 billion years old with a relatively high rate of rotation, having a projected rotational velocity of 87 km/s. The star has 1.26 times the mass of the Sun and is radiating 5.76 times the Sun's luminosity from its photosphere at an effective temperature of 6,749 K. These coordinates are a source of X-ray emission, which is most likely (99.3% chance) coming from the star.

References

F-type main-sequence stars
F-type subgiants
Aquila (constellation)
Durchmusterung objects
Aquilae, 42
185124
096556
7460